Anne Abeja (née Anne Abeja), is a Ugandan lawyer and corporate executive, who, since October 2013, serves as the Company Secretary and head of the legal department at Housing Finance Bank, a Ugandan retail commercial bank.

Prior to assuming her current position in 2013, she served, for nearly nine years, as the company secretary of Monitor Publications, the publishers of the Daily Monitor newspaper in Uganda.

Education
She holds a Bachelor of Laws from Makerere University, in Kampala, Uganda's capital and largest city. She also holds a Diploma in Legal Practice, obtained from the Law Development Centre, also in Kampala. She is a member of the legal bar in Uganda.

She is a qualified Chartered Secretary and also holds a Master of Business Administration, awarded by the Eastern and Southern African Management Institute.

Career
From January 2005 until October 2013, she served as the Company Secretary at Monitor Publications. She was the company's legal representative in February 2010, when Angelo Izama, a senior reporter, and Henry Ochieng, editor of the Sunday Monitor news magazine, were sued by the government of Uganda, alleging that the duo had defamed the president of Uganda.

In October 2013, she was hired by Housing Finance Bank, Uganda's largest mortgage lender as the Head of Legal & Compliance Department and Company Secretary. She still serves in that position as of November 2018.

Other considerations
In her capacity as Company Secretary, she sits on the Board of Directors of Housing Finance Bank, in Uganda. She is an accomplished champion sportswoman, excelling in badminton, lawn tennis and pool.

She is also a member of the East African Law Society serving in different capacities including: 2006-2008 EALS Council Member, 2008-2010 Deputy Secretary General, 2010-2012 Secretary General and 2016-2018 Vice President-Regional Integration.

See also
Peninnah Kasule
Sarah Walusimbi
Agnes Tibayeyita Isharaza

References

External links
Media Regulators: No One Has Complained over Media Reports about Gen Sejusa As of 21 May 2013.

Living people
1977 births
21st-century Ugandan lawyers
Ugandan women lawyers
Makerere University alumni
Law Development Centre alumni
People from Northern Region, Uganda
Eastern and Southern African Management Institute alumni